Semiahmoo (North Straits Salish: SEMYOME or səmyámə)  may refer to:

Semiahmoo Bay, south-eastern section of Boundary Bay, bisected by the US-Canada border near White Rock, British Columbia

In Canada:
Semiahmoo people, a Coast Salish people
Semiahmoo First Nation, government of the Semiahmoo people
Semiahmoo Indian Reserve, the Indian Reserve of the Semiahmoo people
Semiahmoo Peninsula, bounded by the waters of Semiahmoo Bay and Boundary Bay
Semiahmoo Secondary School, public high school in Surrey, British Columbia
Semiahmoo Shopping Centre, shopping mall in Surrey, resting directly against the border with White Rock
Semiahmoo Trail Elementary School, public elementary school in Surrey

In the United States:
Semiahmoo Resort, a major golf resort and spa near Blaine, Washington
Semiahmoo, Washington, an unincorporated community in Washington
Semiahmoo Harbor Light, lighthouse near Blaine, Washington